Dannette is a given name. Notable people with the given name include:
 Dannette Leininger (born 1963), American handball player
 Dannette Thomas (born 1952), American comic book writer
 Dannette Young (born 1964), American track and field athlete
 Dannette Bower (born 1983),
Australian actress